Catalunya is the Catalan name for Catalonia, a part of the Iberian Peninsula in the Mediterranean Sea.

Catalunya also may refer to:

Places
Principat de Catalunya, former political unit of southwestern Europe formed by the grouping of the Catalan counties in 1162 and divided between Spain and France in 1659:
 Catalunya, a political unit inside Spain, today constituted as the Spanish Autonomous Community of Catalonia.
 Catalunya del Nord, a historical region within France, today that closely corresponds with the French département of the Pyrénées-Orientales.
Plaça de Catalunya, Barcelona, a square in Barcelona
 Plaça de Catalunya station
Catalunya (Barcelona Metro), a train station
Catalunya (DO), a wine region of Spain

Sports
 Copa Catalunya, knockout tournament of Catalan football teams
 Supercopa de Catalunya, association football supercup
 Volta a Catalunya, bicycle touring race
 Rally de Catalunya, WRC rally race
 Circuit de Catalunya, automobile race track
 CN Catalunya, Barcelona aquatics club

Other uses
 Catalunya Ràdio, public radio network in Catalonia

See also

Catalan (disambiguation)
Catalonia (disambiguation)
Hotel Catalonia (disambiguation)
Circuit de Barcelona-Catalunya, race track